There are a number of cities or towns named Collinsville:

Australia
Collinsville, Queensland, a rural town in the Whitsunday Region
Collinsville, South Australia, a locality.
Collinsville Station, a pastoral lease in South Australia associated with Collinsville, South Australia.

United States
Collinsville, Alabama
Collinsville, California
Collinsville, Connecticut
Collinsville, Georgia
Collinsville, Illinois, the largest US city named Collinsville
Collinsville, Mississippi
Collinsville, Ohio
Collinsville, Oklahoma
Collinsville, Texas
Collinsville, Virginia